Phoebe Holiday Ryan (born September 21, 1990) is an American singer and songwriter. In 2015, she released a mashup of R. Kelly's "Ignition" and Miguel's "Do You", followed by her first single "Mine" from her debut EP of the same name. She signed with Columbia Records in 2015.

As a songwriter, she has written for artists such as Britney Spears, Oh Honey, Zara Larsson, Melanie Martinez, and Bea Miller, and featured on songs by the Knocks, Tritonal, Skizzy Mars, and the Chainsmokers, among others.

Background 
Ryan grew up in Red Bank, New Jersey, and attended Clive Davis Institute of Recorded Music at New York University, where she studied engineering, production and business. She debated between being a songwriter or an artist before deciding to do both.

Music career 
Ryan's music career began as a vocalist with Town Hall, a band she was part of in college. After the release of Town Hall's album Roots & Bells, she began writing songs for artists such as Oh Honey, rapper Skizzy Mars and Bea Miller. In 2014, she was featured on DJ duo Tritonal's single "Now or Never", and in 2015, she released her first song as an artist, "Ignition/Do You", a mashup of "Ignition" and "Do You". Her first two original singles, "Mine" and "Dead", followed shortly thereafter.

In 2015, Ryan inked a deal with Columbia Records, which released her debut EP, Mine. Her songs have been praised by bloggers and artists alike, with Tove Lo calling "Mine" "GOLD", Taylor Swift including the song on a handwritten list titled "New Songs That Will Make Your Life More Awesome (I promise!)", The Fader calling it "excellent", and Billboard calling Ryan's voice "magnetic". In 2015, Nylon called Ryan a pop singer "primed for stardom".

On March 4, 2016, Ryan released "Chronic", an electropop song. The music video was released in April. "Boyz N Poizn" was released as the second single on May 5, 2016, with its music video released in June.

Bea Miller's song "Young Blood", co-written by Ryan, peaked at number 4 on the Billboard Dance Club Songs and number 40 on the Billboard Mainstream Top 40. It received a Radio Disney Music Award for "Best Song to Rock Out to With your BFFs".

On September 29, 2016, Ryan released the song "All We Know" as part of a collaboration with The Chainsmokers. The song peaked at number 18 on the US Billboard Hot 100 and at number 24 on the UK Singles Chart. On February 3, 2017, Ryan released a new single, "Dark Side".

On August 3, 2017, Ryan released the song "Forgetting All About You", featuring blackbear. It was produced by Big Taste and serves as the lead single from her second extended play, James (2017). James was released on October 27, 2017.

In May 2019, Ryan was announced as the opening act for the second half of Carly Rae Jepsen's Dedicated Tour in the U.S.

In February 2020, Ryan began touring with K-pop artist Eric Nam, as the opening act for his Before We Begin World Tour.

On July 31, 2020, Ryan released her first studio album, How It Used to Feel, consisting of 13 tracks, including four released earlier as singles: "A Thousand Ways", "ICIMY", "Ring", and "Fantasy". She posted on her social media accounts that she began writing songs for her debut album in the summer of 2017. In an interview with V magazine, she said, "I’ve always been an open book as an artist and I think it’s better to share experiences with others. How else will people connect?”.

Discography

Studio albums

Extended plays

Singles

As lead artist

As featured artist

Guest appearances

Songwriting credits

Notes

References

External links 
 

1990 births
Living people
21st-century American women singers
American women pop singers
American indie pop musicians
People from Red Bank, New Jersey
Tisch School of the Arts alumni
21st-century American singers
Singers from New Jersey
Singers from Texas